The Little River National Wildlife Refuge is a National Wildlife Refuge of the United States located in Oklahoma.

The refuge contains most of the remaining bottomland hardwood communities in the southeastern part of the state. It is characterized by low, wet oak and hickory forest with oxbows and sloughs. Trees of the landscape include hickory, willow oak, sweetgum, cypress, white oak, loblolly pine, and walnut.

References
Refuge website 

National Wildlife Refuges in Oklahoma
Protected areas of McCurtain County, Oklahoma
Wetlands of Oklahoma
Landforms of McCurtain County, Oklahoma
Protected areas established in 1987
1987 establishments in Oklahoma